Oleh Oleksiyovych Domin (born 4 August 1947 in Lopatino, Tula Oblast) is a former Ambassador Extraordinary and Plenipotentiary of Ukraine to the Russian Federation.
Ambassador Extraordinary and Plenipotentiary of Ukraine to the People’s Republic of China.

Education 
He graduated from Kharkiv National University of Radioelectronics in 1971 with a major in Radio Engineering, Qualified Expert in Radiophysics. PhD in Economics.

Career 

In 1969-1991 - he worked for government.

In 1991-1994 - he was Vice-President of the corporation "Ukrsibinkor", President of the "Perspectiva XXI", Kharkiv, Ukraine.

In 1994-1996 - Deputy Chairman of the Verkhovna Rada of Ukraine (Parliament).

From 1996 to 2000 - Head of Kharkiv Regional State Administration.

In 2000-2005 - First Deputy Head of the Administration of the President of Ukraine.

In 2005-2006 - Deputy Chairman of the People's Democratic Party of Ukraine.

Domin was appointed to the post as ambassador of Ukraine to Russia by Ukrainian president Viktor Yushchenko in March 2006, and held the post in Moscow until his retirement on 4 April 2008. Konstyantyn Hryshchenko was named as his replacement in June 2008.

In 2008-2010 - Director of the Institute of International Relations of Kyiv National Aviation University, Ukraine.

In 2010-2013 - Ambassador Extraordinary and Plenipotentiary of Ukraine to the Republic of Kazakhstan.

From 2013 - Ambassador Extraordinary and Plenipotentiary of Ukraine to the People’s Republic of China.

Awards 
 Ukrainian Order “For Merits”, 1-st grade.

See also 
 Embassy of Ukraine in Moscow

References 

Living people
Ambassadors of Ukraine to Russia
Ambassadors of Ukraine to Kazakhstan
Ambassadors of Ukraine to China
1947 births
People from Venyovsky District
Russian emigrants to Ukraine
Governors of Kharkiv Oblast
Deputy chairmen of the Verkhovna Rada
Laureates of the State Prize of Ukraine in Science and Technology